Eresina masaka is a butterfly in the family Lycaenidae. It is found in Uganda (the south and the western shores of Lake Victoria), western Kenya and north-western Tanzania. Its habitat consists of dense, primary forests.

References

Butterflies described in 1962
Poritiinae